Ernest Pieterse (4 July 1938 – 1 November 2017) was a racing driver from South Africa. He participated in three Formula One World Championship Grands Prix, debuting on 29 December 1962.  He scored no championship points.

Complete Formula One World Championship results
(key)

Non-Championship

(key)

References
 "The Formula One Record Book", John Thompson, 1974.

1938 births
2017 deaths
South African racing drivers
South African Formula One drivers